The Cologne Communist Trial took place in 1852 in Cologne, Germany, and was conducted by the Prussian government against eleven members of the Communist League who were suspected of having participated in the 1848 uprising. The trial lasted from October 4 to November 12, 1852, and when it was over the Communist League dissolved itself. Seven of the eleven were sentenced to prison terms of up to six years.

Principals

Defendants
Heinrich Burgers
Hermann Wilhelm Haupt
Abraham Jacobi
Frederick Lessner
Peter Nothjung

Other involved parties
Adolph Bermbach

See also
 Revolution and Counter-Revolution in Germany

Footnotes

External links
Revelations Concerning the Communist Trial in Cologne by Karl Marx

Trials in Germany
anti-communism in Germany
19th century in Cologne
German Confederation
Rhine Province